Operation Rentier (Operation Reindeer) was a German operation during World War II intended to secure the nickel mines around Petsamo in Finland, against a Soviet attack in the event of a renewed war between Finland and the Soviet Union.

The planning for the operation started on 13 August 1940, after the German occupation of Norway was complete and was finalized in October that year.

The operation was carried out by the Wehrmacht as part of Operation Barbarossa, the German attack on the Soviet Union and began on 22 June 1941. The 2nd Mountain Division occupied the area around Liinakhamari and the 3rd Mountain Division occupied Luostari. The operation was followed up by Operation Platinum Fox, which was an attack by the two divisions against Murmansk as a part of the larger Operation Silver Fox.

References

Sources

Further reading
 

Arctic military operations of World War II
Operation Barbarossa
Battles and operations of the Soviet–German War
Battles of World War II involving Germany
Battles involving the Soviet Union
Battles involving Finland
1941 in Finland
1941 in the Soviet Union
1941 in Germany
Military operations involving Finland
June 1941 events